Shake/Shiver/Moan is the second studio album by English rock band 22-20s. It is the first to be released since the band reformed and features second guitar Dan Hare and was released in Japan on 19 May 2010 on the Yoshimoto R and C label, and in the United States on the ATO Records sublabel TBD Records on 22 June 2010. Release details for a domestic release are currently unknown. Former keyboardist Charly Coombes appears on track "96 to 4".

Track listing 

Japan only bonus tracks – previously released on the U.S only digital EP Latest Heartbreak Live EP.

References 

2010 albums
22-20s albums
TBD Records albums